Brighton was a  steamship which was  built in 1903 for the London, Brighton and South Coast Railway and London and South Western Railway. She passed to the Southern Railway on 1 January 1923. In 1930, she was sold to W E Guinness and converted to a private yacht, Roussalka (named after Slavonic mythologic creature). She was wrecked at Killary Bay on 25 August 1933.

Description
The ship was built by W Denny & Bros, Dumbarton. She was yard number 683 and was launched on 13 June 1903 with completion in August 1903. She was powered by three steam turbines, which were made by Parsons Steam Turbine Co Ltd, Newcastle upon Tyne.

History
Brighton was built for the London, Brighton and South Coast Railway. She was used on their Newhaven - Dieppe route. She was to have been the first turbine powered steamship built for the LB&SCR but a fire at the shipbuilders delayed her completion, pushing her into second place. Her port of registry was Newhaven. 

Brighton returned to Newhaven to summon aid, and the tug Alert was sent to assist Preußen, which was towed towards Dover. It was intended to anchor her off Dover but both anchor chains broke and Preußen was driven onto rocks where she sank as a result of the damage inflicted to her. The master of Brighton was found to be responsible for the accident and lost his licence as a result. He later committed suicide by shooting himself in a London pub.

In 1914, Brighton was requisitioned by the Royal Navy for use as a troopship. She was later used as a hospital ship. On 19 December 1914, she rescued the survivors of the naval trawler , which had been sunk by a mine in the North Sea off Scarborough, Yorkshire. Brighton brought the American President Woodrow Wilson back to Dover after the signing of the Treaty of Versailles. Brighton was returned to her owners in 1920. Brighton passed to the Southern Railway at Grouping. In 1930, Brighton was sold to W E Guinness, who converted her to a private yacht named Roussalka. Her steam turbines were replaced by a diesel engine and one of her two funnels was removed. She was renamed Roussalka. On 25 August 1933, in thick fog, Roussalka was wrecked on Blood Slate Rock, Freaklin Island, Killary Bay. All passengers and crew were rescued.

Official Number and code letters
Official Numbers were a forerunner to IMO Numbers. Brighton had the United Kingdom Official Number 105654 and used the Code Letters VDWN.

See also
 Rusalka

References

1903 ships
Ships built on the River Clyde
Ships of the London, Brighton and South Coast Railway
Steamships of the United Kingdom
Merchant ships of the United Kingdom
Maritime incidents in 1910
Troop ships of the Royal Navy
Hospital ships of the Royal Navy
Ships of the Southern Railway (UK)
Maritime incidents in 1933
Hospital ships in World War I